Kentawka Canal is a stream in the U.S. state of Mississippi.

Variant names are "Kentawah Canal", "Kentawaha Creek" and "Kentawha Creek". Kentawka is a name derived from the Choctaw language purported to mean "place where beavers are brought forth in abundance".

References

Rivers of Mississippi
Rivers of Neshoba County, Mississippi
Mississippi placenames of Native American origin